No More Pain is the first full-length studio album by the Japanese band Doom.

Track listing 

 Death To Wimp! - 4:40  
 Body No Body - 5:17  
 I'm Your Junky Doll - 3:49  
 You Don't Cry... No Long Life - 3:22  
 No More Pain - 7:55  
 Iron Card - 3:21  
 Kick It Out! - 3:56  
 'Til Death - 4:32

1987 albums
Doom (Japanese band) albums